Elm Hall is an unincorporated community and census-designated place (CDP) in Gratiot County in the U.S. state of Michigan.  The CDP had a population of 279 at the 2020 census.  The community is located within Sumner Township.  

As an unincorporated community, Elm Hall has no legal autonomy of its own but does have its own post office with the 48830 ZIP Code.

History
Elm Hall was first settled in 1855 by brothers Jacob, Michael, and Nathaniel Strayer and their families.  Sumner Township was established that same year.  The families all lived in a long building (or hall) that was made out of elm logs, and the community name became known as Elm Hall.  A post office was established on August 18, 1857 with Baron Blanchard serving as the first postmaster.  The community was platted and recorded in 1863. 

For the 2020 census, Elm Hall was included as a newly-listed census-designated place.  Elm Hall continues to remain an unincorporated community with no legal autonomy of its own.

Geography

The Pine River flows through the community.

Other nearby unincorporated communities include Riverdale to the north, Sumner to the south, Vestaburg to the northwest, and Elwell to the northeast.

The Elm Hall post office uses the 48830 ZIP Code and is primarily for post office box services only.  The post office is located at 5025 North Lumberjack Road in the center of the community.  The surrounding area uses the Riverdale 48877 ZIP Code post office located to the north in the community of Riverdale.  The Elm Hall post office is unofficially considered the smallest post office building in the state of Michigan.  It may be among the smallest active post office buildings in the United States after the Silver Lake post office, the Salvo Post Office, and the Ochopee Post Office.

Demographics

Education
The community of Elm Hall is served by Alma Public Schools to the east in the city of Alma.

References

Unincorporated communities in Gratiot County, Michigan
Unincorporated communities in Michigan
Census-designated places in Gratiot County, Michigan
Census-designated places in Michigan
Populated places established in 1855
1855 establishments in Michigan